Karlo Plantak (born 11 November 1997) is a Croatian professional footballer who plays as a midfielder for SSU Politehnica Timișoara.

Honours
Celje
Slovenian PrvaLiga: 2019–20

References

External links
Karlo Plantak at HNS 

1997 births
Living people
Croatian footballers
Footballers from Zagreb
Croatia youth international footballers
Association football midfielders
GNK Dinamo Zagreb II players
NK Slaven Belupo players
NK Celje players
NK Kustošija players
NK Aluminij players
SSU Politehnica Timișoara players
First Football League (Croatia) players
Croatian Football League players
Slovenian PrvaLiga players
Liga II players
Croatian expatriate footballers
Expatriate footballers in Slovenia
Croatian expatriate sportspeople in Slovenia
Expatriate footballers in Romania
Croatian expatriate sportspeople in Romania